Nazar Viktorovych Kovalenko (born 9 February 1987 in Vinnytsia Oblast) is a Ukrainian racewalker. He competed in the 20 km walk at the 2012 Summer Olympics, where he placed 27th.

Achievements

References

1987 births
Living people
Ukrainian male racewalkers
Olympic athletes of Ukraine
Athletes (track and field) at the 2012 Summer Olympics
Athletes (track and field) at the 2016 Summer Olympics
Universiade medalists in athletics (track and field)
Universiade gold medalists for Ukraine
Universiade silver medalists for Ukraine
Medalists at the 2013 Summer Universiade
Medalists at the 2015 Summer Universiade
Sportspeople from Vinnytsia Oblast